A carbamoyl chloride is the functional group with the formula R2NC(O)Cl. The parent carbamoyl chloride, H2NCOCl is unstable, but many N-substituted analogues are known.  Most examples are moisture sensitive, colourless, and soluble in nonpolar organic solvents. An example is dimethylcarbamoyl chloride (m.p. −90 °C and b.p. 93 °C). Carbamoyl chlorides are used to prepare a number of pesticides, e.g. carbofuran and aldicarb.

Production and examples
Carbamoyl chlorides are prepared by the reaction of an amine with phosgene: 
2 R2NH + COCl2 → R2NCOCl + [R2NH2]Cl

They also arise by the addition of hydrogen chloride to isocyanates:
RNCO + HCl → RNHCOCl
In this way, carbamonyl chlorides can be prepared with N-H functionality.

Reactions
In a reaction that is typically avoided, hydrolysis of carbamoyl chlorides gives carbamic acids:
R2NCOCl + H2O → R2NC(O)OH + HCl
Owing to the influence of the amino group, these compounds are less hydrolytically sensitive than the usual acid chlorides.
A related but more useful reaction is the analogous reaction with alcohols:
R2NCOCl + R'OH + C5H5N → R2NC(O)OR' + C5H5NHCl

References

Functional groups